"Bon Voyage" is a song written by Roger Hart-Wells and recorded by Australian band Little Heroes. The song was released in November 1983 as the second single from the band's third studio album, Watch the World (1983). The single peaked on the Australian Kent Music Report at #51.

Track listings
7" Single (EMI-1135)
Side A "Bon Voyage" - 3:37
Side B "Let It Go" - 4:12

Charts

References

1983 singles
1983 songs